La Armuña is a comarca in the province of Salamanca, Castile and León.  It contains 30 municipalities:

 Aldeanueva de Figueroa
 Arcediano
 Cabezabellosa de la Calzada
 Cabrerizos
 Calzada de Valdunciel
 Castellanos de Moriscos
 Castellanos de Villiquera
 El Pedroso de la Armuña
 Espino de la Orbada
 Forfoleda
 Gomecello
 La Orbada
 La Vellés
 Monterrubio de Armuña
 Moriscos
 Negrilla de Palencia
 Pajares de la Laguna
 Palencia de Negrilla
 Parada de Rubiales
 Pedrosillo el Ralo
 Pitiegua
 San Cristóbal de la Cuesta
 Tardáguila
 Topas
 Torresmenudas
 Valdunciel
 Valverdón
 Villamayor
 Villares de la Reina
 Villaverde de Guareña

References

Comarcas of the Province of Salamanca